is a Japanese actress and voice actress associated with 81 Produce and Avex Pictures. She voiced Ayumi Hayashi in Wake Up, Girls! New Chapter! and Mirai Momoyama in Kiratto Pri Chan.

Biography
Hayashi was born in Hamamatsu, Shizuoka Prefecture, to an anime-loving father. She was a member of Space Craft Junior as a child and appeared in Oha Suta by 2013. She participated in a live event of voice actress Nana Mizuki and aspired to be a voice actress influenced by her performance. After receiving the recommendation of her father, she successfully auditioned in 2017 avex×81produce Wake Up, Girls! AUDITION. Her career started when she starred as Ayumi Hayashi in the 2017 Wake Up, Girls! spinoff New Chapter!, and she formed the unit Run Girls, Run! with Yūka Morishima and Nanami Atsugi. In 2018, she voiced the lead character of Kiratto Pri Chan, Mirai Momoyama, and she starred in King of Prism: Shiny Seven Stars as Nagisa Takahashi. She also won the Best New Actress Award at the 13th Seiyu Awards alongside Kaede Hondo, Rina Honnizumi, Manaka Iwami, and Tomori Kusunoki. She also voiced a schoolgirl in the 2019 Love Live! Sunshine!! film.

Filmography

Anime
2017
Wake Up, Girls! New Chapter!, Ayumi Hayashi
2018
Kiratto Pri Chan, Mirai Momoyama
2019
King of Prism: Shiny Seven Stars, Nagisa Takahashi
The Promised Neverland, Ugen, Damdin, and Rossy
2020
Nekopara, child
2023
MF Ghost, Mami Satō

Film
2018
 Kiratto Pri Chan: Kirakira Memorial Live, Mirai Momoyama
2019
 Love Live! Sunshine!! The School Idol Movie: Over the Rainbow, schoolgirl A

References

External links
Official agency profile 

2002 births
Living people
Avex Group talents
Japanese child actresses
Japanese video game actresses
Japanese voice actresses
Musicians from Shizuoka Prefecture
Run Girls, Run! members
Voice actors from Hamamatsu
Voice actresses from Shizuoka Prefecture
81 Produce voice actors